NA-203 Khairpur-II is a constituency for the National Assembly of Pakistan.

Election 2002 

General elections were held on 10 Oct 2002. Pir Sadaruddin Shah of PML-F won by 63,520 votes.

Election 2008 

General elections were held on 18 Feb 2008. Pir Sadaruddin Shah of PML-F won by 97,347 votes.

Election 2013 

General elections were held on 11 May 2013. Pir Sadaruddin Shah of PML-F won by 86,982 votes and became the  member of National Assembly. Whereas, Sajid Ali Banbhan was opponent candidate .

Election 2018 

General elections are scheduled to be held on 25 July 2018.

See also
NA-202 Khairpur-I
NA-204 Khairpur-III

References

External links 
Election result's official website

NA-216
Thari Mirwah